Village cricket is a term, sometimes pejorative, given to the playing of cricket in rural villages in England and Wales. Many villages have their own teams that play at varying levels in local or regional club cricket leagues.

When organised cricket first began in the 17th century, matches were played between rival parishes or villages and this form of competition endured. In representative cricket a team includes players from more than one parish (e.g., a team that represents a county or a country).

Village cricket teams are often made up of local residents only, although some teams' first XI can include players with connections to minor counties cricket clubs and members of the academies of the county cricket club of the county in which the team lies.

Cricket in this form is often played on a village green or other public space instead of a dedicated ground, and the public may spectate.

In many non-professional cricket leagues, the adjective "village" is a descriptor used humorously, self-deprecatingly, or, sometimes, pejoratively to convey a sense of amateurishness of some aspect of the team's (or an individual's) preparation, dress, conduct or play.

Village Cup
The annual National Village Cup competition began in 1972 and each year's competition is covered in detail (particularly the final) in the following Wisden Cricketers' Almanack. The Cricketer magazine is responsible for organising the competition.

It is open to qualifying teams (ie those from villages (not towns) up to a set maximum population - originally 2,500 but has risen to 10,000  - and surrounded by open countryside) from across England, Wales and Scotland. The final is played at Lord's Cricket Ground in London. The competition's headline sponsor has changed often in recent years; the 2017 competition was chiefly sponsored by British milk producers, Watsons.

In popular media
 The Midsomer Murders episode "Dead Man's Eleven" has a sub-plot about two village teams playing against each other.
 Outside Edge, a 1979 play by Richard Harris about a village cricket team; two TV adaptations were made.
 "When an Old Cricketer Leaves the Crease" is a 1975 song by Roy Harper that captures the atmosphere of a village cricket match.

See also
List of English and Welsh cricket league clubs
Cricket in England
Cricket in Wales
Twicket

References

External links 
 National Village Cup Home

Cricket terminology
Club cricket
Forms of cricket